Sons of Anarchy: Songs of Anarchy Vol. 3 is a soundtrack album featuring music from the FX television program Sons of Anarchy, and is a follow-up to the 2012 release Sons of Anarchy: Songs of Anarchy Vol. 2 and several earlier EPs from the popular show.  The album has sold 23,000 copies in the United States as of February 2015.

The songs are performed by The Forest Rangers, the "house band" of the series led by Bob Thiele Jr. The Forest Rangers serve as the Sons Of Anarchy house band, which includes the show's music composer Bob Thiele Jr, Greg Leisz (guitar/banjo), John Philip Shenale (keyboards), Lyle Workman (guitar), Dave Way (recording Engineer and Sergeant at Arms), Davey Faragher (bass), Brian Macleod (drums) and Velvet Revolver guitarist Dave Kushner.

Track listing

In popular culture 
"Lullaby for a Soldier" was used in the teaser trailer for the 2019 film Alita: Battle Angel, based on the manga Battle Angel Alita by Yukito Kishiro.

References

Sons of Anarchy
2013 soundtrack albums